Christos "Chris" Moraitis,  (born 1962) is a senior Australian public servant, serving as Director-General of the Office of the Special Investigator within the Department of Defence since 2021.

Life and career
Moraitis was born in Melbourne in 1962. He joined the Australian Public Service in the Department of Foreign Affairs and Trade in 1989 as a Graduate Trainee.

Moriatis was Senior Legal Adviser in the Department of Foreign Affairs and Trade from November 2002 to December 2006, Australian High Commissioner to Papua New Guinea from 2006 to 2009 and, in April 2013, he was appointed a Deputy Secretary at Foreign Affairs and Trade. He served less than 18 months in the role before being promoted in September 2014 to head the Attorney-General's Department, his first job outside Foreign Affairs and Trade since he commenced his public service career. In 2021 he commenced as Director-General of the Office of the Special Investigator, the Special Investigator being Mark Weinberg. The agency was established following the completion of the Brereton Report. While originally coming under the Department of Home Affairs, this agency was moved to the portfolio of the Attorney-General of Australia, its task being the investigation of possible war crimes in Afghanistan by Australian forces.

Awards
Moraitis was awarded a Public Service Medal in June 2014 for "outstanding public service to Australia's international affairs as Australia's High Commissioner to Port Moresby and in senior legal and corporate roles at the Department of Foreign Affairs and Trade".

References

1962 births
Australian public servants
High Commissioners of Australia to Papua New Guinea
Living people
Recipients of the Public Service Medal (Australia)
People from Melbourne